Mashuk is a mountain in the Russian Federation, in the North Caucasus.

See also
Beshtau

Mountains of Russia
Landforms of Stavropol Krai
Mountains of the Caucasus